The 2018 Southland Conference baseball tournament was held from May 23 through 26.  The top eight regular season finishers of the league's thirteen teams met in the double-elimination tournament, which was held at Constellation Field in Sugar Land, Texas.  As the winner of the tournament,  earned the conference's automatic bid to the 2018 NCAA Division I baseball tournament.  It was Northwestern State's first Tournament championship.

Seeding and format
The top eight finishers from the regular season were seeded one through eight.  They played a two bracket, double-elimination tournament, with the winner of each bracket meeting in a single championship final.

Results

Schedule

All-Tournament Team
The following players were named to the All-Tournament Team.

Most Valuable Player
David Fry was named Tournament Most Valuable Player.  Fry was a first baseman for Northwestern State.

References

Tournament
Southland Conference Baseball Tournament
Southland Conference baseball tournament
Southland Conference baseball tournament